Bedellia luridella is a moth in the family Bedelliidae. It was described by Johann Müller-Rutz in 1922. It was described from Switzerland.

References

Natural History Museum Lepidoptera generic names catalog

Bedelliidae
Moths described in 1922